Selviria is a genus of aphodiine dung beetles in the family Scarabaeidae. There are at least two described species in Selviria, both found in Brazil. Selviria matogrossoensis has been reported in a nest of fire ants.

Species
These two species belong to the genus Selviria:
 Selviria anneae Stebnicka, 2005 c g
 Selviria matogrossoensis Stebnicka, 1999 c g
Data sources: i = ITIS, c = Catalogue of Life, g = GBIF, b = Bugguide.net

References

Further reading

 
 
 
 
 
 

Scarabaeidae
Scarabaeidae genera